Halalgoogling is an Islamic internet search engine, launched on 9 July 2013. During the holy month of Ramadan, Halalgoogling is used to block content that is deemed haram by Sharia law. It collects results from other web search engines such as Google and Bing and presents only the halal results to its users.

References 

Internet search engines
Web service providers
Islamic websites